Pulicaria aromatica is a species of flowering plant in the family Asteraceae. It is found only in Yemen. Its natural habitats are subtropical or tropical dry forests and rocky areas.

References

aromatica
Endemic flora of Socotra
Endangered plants
Taxonomy articles created by Polbot
Taxa named by Isaac Bayley Balfour